Trufant is an unincorporated community and census-designated place (CDP) in Maple Valley Township, Montcalm County, Michigan, United States. Muskellunge Lake is in the eastern part of the CDP; it drains south through a chain of lakes to Clear Creek and eventually the Flat River, a tributary of the Grand River.

Trufant was first listed as a CDP prior to the 2020 census.

Demographics

References 

Census-designated places in Montcalm County, Michigan
Census-designated places in Michigan
Unincorporated communities in Montcalm County, Michigan
Unincorporated communities in Michigan